USS Washington was a large row galley, with a rowing crew of 60, that was placed into service under the control of the Continental Congress in 1776. During this age of sail, row galleys were highly maneuverable compared to sailing ships whose movements were dependent on the wind. Washingtons war record consisted of an attack on several British warships, and, after finding itself on the losing side of the battle, the row galley rowed away, out of danger. There is no further report of her efforts for the Continental Navy.

Authorized by Rhode Island 

In the autumn of 1775, the Rhode Island General Assembly ordered the construction of two row galleys, Washington and Spitfire, and in January 1776 appointed John Grimes commodore of galleys. During the winter and spring of 1776, these galleys operated in Narragansett Bay, protecting the colony's shipping, carrying troops, and covering foraging parties seeking supplies.

The General Assembly voted and resolved that;

Seeking battle with the British 

In July, the galleys were sent to New York City to join the tiny flotilla George Washington was fitting out on the Hudson River and apparently came under Continental control.

On the afternoon of 3 August, Washington served as flagship for Lieutenant Colonel Benjamin Tupper as that officer led an attack on the Royal Navy's warships Phoenix and Rose. As the galleys approached, Phoenix opened fire on the American boats to begin an action at grapeshot range which lasted some two hours before the Americans retired to Dobb's Ferry. During the engagement, four Americans were killed, and 14 others were wounded. On the British side, Phoenix was hulled twice and suffered substantial damage.

Fate 
There is no record of Washington and her sister galleys after the British captured Manhattan Island late in the summer.

See also
Captain Abraham Godwin, Captain of Marines

References

Sources

External links 

Row galleys of the Continental Navy
Ships of the Continental Navy
Rhode Island in the American Revolution
Ships built in Rhode Island
1776 ships
Ships named for Founding Fathers of the United States